Gustav Långbacka (born 8 May 1984) is a Finnish football goalkeeper who played in the Veikkausliiga for IFK Mariehamn.

Långbacka's sister is the football referee Lina Lehtovaara.

References

1984 births
Living people
Swedish-speaking Finns
Finnish footballers
Kokkolan Palloveikot players
IFK Mariehamn players
FC Ilves players
Association football goalkeepers
Veikkausliiga players
Ykkönen players
Kakkonen players
GBK Kokkola players
People from Kokkola
Sportspeople from Central Ostrobothnia